Hot Country Songs and Country Airplay are charts that rank the top-performing country music songs in the United States, published by Billboard magazine.  Hot Country Songs ranks songs based on digital downloads, streaming, and airplay not only from country stations but from stations of all formats, a methodology introduced in 2012.  Country Airplay, which was published for the first time in 2012, is based solely on country radio airplay, a methodology which had previously been used for several decades for Hot Country Songs.  In 2014, 13 different songs topped the Hot Country Songs chart and 35 different songs topped Country Airplay in 52 issues of the magazine.

Jason Aldean had the longest unbroken run at number one on the Hot Country Songs, spending 14 consecutive weeks in the top spot with "Burnin' It Down".  Luke Bryan spent the most total weeks at number one during the year, however.  His songs "Drink a Beer" and "Play It Again" totaled 14 weeks atop the chart and he spent a further 6 weeks in the top spot as a featured vocalist on Florida Georgia Line's chart-topper "This Is How We Roll" for a total of 20 weeks at number one.  Bryan and Florida Georgia Line were the acts with the most number ones during 2014, as each act had two chart-toppers in addition to their collaboration on "This Is How We Roll".  No other act had more than one number one during the year.  Bryan also spent the most weeks at number one on the Country Airplay listing, but with a much smaller total of seven weeks.  This figure included a run of four consecutive weeks with "Play It Again", which tied with Florida Georgia Line's "Stay" for the longest unbroken run at the top of the radio-based chart during 2014.  Bryan and Florida Georgia Line were both associated with bro-country, an emerging subgenre which incorporated elements from hip hop music and emphasized lyrics about partying, drinking, and attractive young women.  Blake Shelton had the most chart-toppers on the airplay listing, reaching the top spot with "Doin' What She Likes", "Neon Light" and "My Eyes".

Several acts gained their first number ones during 2014, including Sam Hunt, whose "Leave the Night On" topped both charts in the same week in November.  Singer Cole Swindell reached the top of the Hot Country Songs listing with his debut single, "Chillin' It".  Frankie Ballard achieved his first career number one when he reached the peak position on Country Airplay with "Helluva Life", and went on to gain his second number one on the same chart later in the year with "Sunshine & Whiskey". Gwen Sebastian, a former contestant on the second season of TV's The Voice, was a first-time chart-topper when she was featured on the song "My Eyes" by Blake Shelton, who had coached her on the show.  "Where It's At" gave Dustin Lynch his first appearance at number one in September,  and teenaged female duo Maddie & Tae gained their first number-one single in December with "Girl in a Country Song", a retort to bro-country, and in particular the depiction of women in the style's lyrics.

Chart history

See also
2014 in music
List of artists who reached number one on the U.S. country chart
List of Top Country Albums number ones of 2014
List of number-one country singles of 2014 (Canada)

References

2014
Number-one country singles
United States Country Singles